Ester Alexandra Crețu (born 21 July 1993), known professionally as Ester Peony (formerly only Ester), is a Romanian singer and songwriter. She represented Romania in the Eurovision Song Contest 2019 with the song "On a Sunday" after winning the selection show Selecția Națională 2019. However, she failed to qualify for the Grand Final in Tel Aviv. Peony started to compose music for Romanian artists before gaining recognition for posting covers on YouTube in 2015. Later that year, she attained commercial success in Romania with her single "Sub aripa ta" featuring Vescan.

Early life
Ester Alexandra Crețu was born in Câmpulung, Romania on 21 July 1993. She and her parents emigrated to Montreal, Canada in 2001. There, she showed a particular interest in music and started studying jazz singing at the age of eight. Peony relocated to Romania four years later and graduated from the Dinu Lipatti High School of Art in Pitești, where she studied classic singing and classic guitar. In 2013, she enrolled at the Music Interpretation Faculty in Bucharest to study jazz.

Career
Peony released her debut single "Cuminte de Crăciun" under her mononym Ester in late 2014. At the same time, she had been composing music for other Romanian artists. In 2015, she started posting covers on YouTube. The cover videos gained her attention, and she was subsequently offered a record deal with a Romanian label. Later that year, Peony released the song "Sub aripa ta", featuring Romanian rapper Vescan. The song was played on radio and television stations across the country. In 2016, she embarked on her first tour with Vescan. The singer changed her stage name to Ester Peony and independently distributed her debut EP Dig It in May 2018, for which she was also one of the main composers.

In February 2019, Romanian Television (TVR) announced her as the Romanian representative for the Eurovision Song Contest 2019 in Tel Aviv, Israel, after she won the selection show Selecția Națională with her song "On a Sunday". The announcement was met with mixed reactions from the public. In 2019, TVR were able to spend significant amounts on their Eurovision entry for the first time; they spent about 100,000 euros on the visual and special effects in the performance. Romania failed to qualify for the Eurovision Grand Final as their second consecutive—and second overall—non-qualification, placing 13th with 71 points. During her Eurovision time, Peony had signed a record deal with Cat Music, and is currently working on her debut studio album. She performed at the 2019 Golden Stag Festival.

Influences and personal life
Peony cites Delia, Celine Dion, Whitney Houston, Cher, Queen, Michael Jackson and Ariana Grande as some of her musical inspirations. Her stage name refers to the peony flower. In Romanian, "peony" translates to "bujor", which refers to part of her mother's name. The singer has been in a relationship with Alexandru Șerbu since about 2013; Șerbu acted as producer for "On a Sunday". Peony is a Christian.

Discography

Extended plays

Singles

As lead artist

As featured artist

References 

21st-century Romanian singers
21st-century Romanian women singers
Eurovision Song Contest entrants of 2019
English-language singers from Romania
1993 births
Living people
Eurovision Song Contest entrants for Romania
Romanian women pop singers
Romanian singer-songwriters
Romanian expatriates in Canada
People from Câmpulung